Phalaenopsis boulbetii is a species of orchid endemic to Cambodia. 
This species grows lithophytically. The specific epithet boulbetii honours the French cartographer Jean Boulbet.

Conservation
This species is protected unter the CITES appendix II regulations of international trade.

References

boulbetii
Orchids of Cambodia